Megan Hunt (born 21 December 1995) is an Australian rules footballer who played for the Brisbane Lions in the AFL Women's.

Early life
Hunt was born in 1995. She was playing for University of Queensland when she was drafted.

AFLW career
Hunt was recruited by Brisbane with the number 63 pick in the 2016 AFL Women's draft. She made her debut in the Lions' inaugural game against Melbourne at Casey Fields on 5 February 2017.

Brisbane signed Hunt for the 2018 season during the trade period in May 2017.

In April 2019, Hunt was delisted by Brisbane.

References

External links

1995 births
Living people
Sportswomen from Queensland
Australian rules footballers from Queensland
Brisbane Lions (AFLW) players
20th-century Australian women
21st-century Australian women